Manuel David Afonso (born 3 March 1994), best known as Ary Papel, is an Angolan footballer who plays as a forward or winger for Libyan club Al Akhdar.

Club career
In 2018–19, he returned to Primeiro de Agosto in Angola's premier league, the Girabola after a stint in Liga NOS with Sporting B.

On 7 October 2020, Saudi club Al-Taawoun announced that Ary Papel would join them for two years. Three weeks later, he joined Egyptian club Ismaily.

International career

International goals
Scores and results list Angola's goal tally first.

References

External links 
 
 Ary Papel 1º de Agosto profile

Living people
1994 births
Association football midfielders
Angolan footballers
Angola international footballers
C.D. Primeiro de Agosto players
Moreirense F.C. players
Primeira Liga players
Angolan expatriate footballers
Angolan expatriate sportspeople in Portugal
Expatriate footballers in Portugal
Expatriate footballers in Egypt
Ismaily SC players
Al Akhdar SC players
People from Cabinda (city)
Angola A' international footballers
2016 African Nations Championship players